Kyivskyi District is urban district of the city of Donetsk, Ukraine, named after the capital city of Ukraine, Kyiv.

Places

External links
 Kyivskyi Raion at the Mayor of Donetsk website
 Kyivskyi Raion at the Uzovka website

Urban districts of Donetsk